Agent Cooper may refer to:

 Dale Cooper, a character from American TV series, Twin Peaks
 Edward Cooper, a character from American TV series, Medium
 A recording alias of German electronic musician Lars Lewandowski